Dünkheger ( Dungheger ûûl), also known as Mount Altun Obo, is the highest peak of Baitag Bogda,  a mountain range in the Altai Mountains of Asia.

See also
 List of Ultras of Central Asia
 List of mountains in Mongolia
 List of mountains in China

References

Mountains of Mongolia
Mountains of Xinjiang
International mountains of Asia
China–Mongolia border